The following elections occurred in the year 1859.

 1859 Liberian general election
 1859 Newfoundland general election

North America

Canada
 1859 Newfoundland general election

United States
 1859 New York state election

Europe

United Kingdom
 1859 Irish (UK) general election
 1859 United Kingdom general election

See also
 :Category:1859 elections

1859
Elections